Waverly Township may refer to the following places:

 Waverly Township, Cheboygan County, Michigan
 Waverly Township, Van Buren County, Michigan
 Waverly Township, Martin County, Minnesota
 Waverly Township, Lincoln County, Missouri
 Waverly Township, Lackawanna County, Pennsylvania
 Waverly Township, Codington County, South Dakota
 Waverly Township, Marshall County, South Dakota

See also

Waverly (disambiguation)

Township name disambiguation pages